Catharina Christina "Cajsa" Wahllund (1 May 1771, Värmland, Sweden – 13 July 1843, Helsinki) was a Swedish-born Finnish restaurateur.

Wahllund moved from Sweden to Finland in 1810. She was the successful owner of a popular inn and restaurant in Åbo (1812–1819) and Helsinki (1819–1843) in Finland. She has been regarded as having introduced restaurants to Finland. She was a successful and popular businesswoman, and was especially popular among students: her restaurant became a known center of students.

Legacy
The Kaisaniemi Park was named after her.

References

1771 births
1843 deaths
19th-century Finnish businesswomen
19th-century Finnish businesspeople
Swedish restaurateurs
Swedish emigrants to Finland
Finnish restaurateurs